The Apocalypse of Paul (Apocalypsis Pauli, more commonly known in the Latin tradition as the  or ) is a fourth-century non-canonical apocalypse and part of the New Testament apocrypha. The full original Greek version of the Apocalypse is lost, although fragmentary versions still exist. Using later versions and translations, the text has been reconstructed, notably from Latin and Syriac translations. The text is not to be confused with the gnostic Coptic Apocalypse of Paul, which is unlikely to be related.

The text, which is pseudepigraphal, purports to present a detailed account of a vision of Heaven and Hell experienced by Paul the Apostle.  While the work was not accepted among the Church leaders, it helped to shape the beliefs of many Christians concerning the nature of the afterlife.  At the end of the text, Paul or the Virgin Mary (depending on the manuscript) manages to persuade God to give everyone in Hell a day off every Sunday.

Authorship and date 
The author of the work is unknown.  The book opens with a discovery narrative that explains that while the Apostle Paul wrote it, the book was then buried beneath the foundations of a house in Tarsus (Paul's hometown) for centuries until an angel ordered the compiler to dig it up.  The book claims this discovery happened during the reign of Emperor Theodosius I (reigned 379–395), giving a good estimate of roughly when the narrative appeared.  (The Christian author Sozomen wrote that he investigated this claim, and an elderly priest of Tarsus had no recollection of such a bizarre event occurring; rather, it was transparently an attempt to explain how a "new" work of Paul could be published.)  The author may have been familiar with 2 Corinthians Chapter 12, where Paul discusses how he knew of a person who visited the third heaven; the work implies that person was Paul himself.

The author of the Apocalypse of Paul was probably Egyptian. Constantin von Tischendorf, M. R. James, and Bart Ehrman all date it to the late 4th century. The text had to exist by 415, as Augustine makes a disparaging comment about it in his Tractates on the Gospel of John. A few scholars date the book earlier, to the middle of the 3rd century, and suggest that only the introduction was written in the late 4th century.

Content
The text is primarily focused on a detailed account of Heaven and Hell. The author seems to be familiar with the "Book of the Watchers" in the Book of Enoch, the Apocalypse of Zephaniah, and the Apocalypse of Peter as influences on the work.  Nevertheless, the accounts of Heaven and Hell in the Apocalypse of Paul differ from its predecessors in some major ways.  The Apocalypse of Peter was written during a period when Christians were a minority struggling to gain adherents, and tensions with pagans and Jews were a major issue.  The Apocalypse of Paul was written much later when Christianity had become the accepted and majority religion of the Roman Empire.  As such, much of its focus is not on external issues, but rather issues internal to Christianity.  More devout and ascetic Christians will be rewarded additionally in heaven beyond what is given to more passive Christians; Christians who err in some manner, whether by heresy, or a failure to uphold ascetic vows, will be condemned to hell.  The text gives little to no discussion to non-Christians, seemingly considering them irrelevant; its Hell is one of punishment for faulty Christians.

The text is heavily moralistic, and considers pride the root of all evil and the worst sin.  It also describes and names various fallen angels in hell, including Temeluchus and the tartaruchi.

Structure
The chapters of the text are roughly organized as:

 1, 2. Discovery of the revelation.
 3–6. Prologue: Appeal of creation to God against the sin of man.
 7–10. The report of the angels to God about men.
 11–18. Deaths and judgements of the righteous and the wicked.
 19–30. First vision of Paradise, including lake Acherusa.
 31–44. Hell. Paul obtains rest on Sunday for the lost.
 45–51. Second vision of Paradise.

Introduction: The sinfulness of man
After a discovery narrative that explains the work was found under a house in Tarsus, Paul visits the third heaven.  There, the sun, moon, stars, sea and land complain to God of mankind's sinfulness.  God has shown forbearance only to allow humanity to convert and repent.  Guardian angels monitor men and describe to God these human activities every morning and every night.  Paul watches as both a righteous man and a sinner die, and the reports of the dead sinner's watcher angel are used against him.  Paul then turns to the gates and is led by the angel into the third heaven, where he meets Elijah and Enoch, and is given a tour.

Heaven and hell
The Apocalypse of Paul goes into considerably more detail than the Apocalypse of Peter on the nature of heaven.  In chapters 20–30, heaven has three divisions.  "Paradise" is the third heaven is where Paul arrives first, but it is not closely described.  Paul then descends into the second heaven afterward, the "Land of Promise", a reinterpretation of the "land of milk and honey" (in heaven, rather than the land of Israel) which is seemingly a holding area for deceased saints who are waiting on the Second Coming of Jesus and the millennial kingdom of God.  The first heaven, across the Acherusian Lake, is the "City of Christ" where the blessed will reside for eternity, presumably after the millennial age.  Paul does find some dwelling in the City already, such as the Biblical prophets of Judaism and the patriarchs of the twelve tribes.  Outside the city are ascetics who were too proud of their asceticism, and are forced to wait for entry until Christ returns and their pride is appropriately chastened.  The city itself is subdivided into twelve layers, with things becoming continually better and better the closer to the center inhabitants get.  Those who deny themselves physical pleasure in the mortal world are rewarded wildly in the afterlife with better places in the City of Christ, closer to the center.  Finally, after the tour of hell, Paul returns to "Paradise" in chapters 45–51, but it is unclear if this means the third layer again, heaven in general, or a new fourth layer.  There Paul meets other Biblical figures, some of which were described as already being in other layers in the earlier passages.  It is possible that this account was originally from a separate story that was combined into the Apocalypse of Paul, as it does not entirely cohere with the earlier vision of Heaven.

In hell, those punished are Christians who have erred.  While some "usual" sins such as usury, adultery, and women having sex before marriage are condemned, the Apocalypse of Paul goes beyond this.  Various "bad" Christians are made to stand in a river of fire, including Christians who left the church and argued; Christians who took the Eucharist but then fornicated; and Christians who "slandered" other Christians while in church.  Christians who failed to pay attention as the word of God was read in Church are forced to gnaw on their tongues eternally.  Christians who commit infanticide are torn to shreds by beasts eternally while also on fire.  Church leaders and theologians who preached incorrect doctrine or were simply incompetent in their positions are punished with torture.  For example, a church reader who failed to implement the word of God he read during church services in his own life is thrown into a river of fire while an angel slashes his lips and tongue with a razor.  Unholy nuns are thrown into a furnace of fire along with a bishop as punishment (in one Latin manuscript, likely a later addition).  Failed ascetics are also punished; those who ended their fasts before their appointed time are taunted by abundant food and water just out of reach as they lie parched and starving in hell.  Those who wore the habit of a monk or nun while failing to show charity are given new habits of pitch and sulphur, serpents are wrapped around their necks, and fiery angels physically beat them.  The worst punishments ("seven times worse" than those described so far) are reserved for theologically deviant Christians, such as those who believe that Jesus's Second Coming will be a "spiritual" resurrection rather than a "physical" resurrection, or who deny that Jesus came in the flesh (docetism).  The exact nature of their punishment is left to the imagination; an awful stench rises from a sealed well that hints of their torment below.

One theological oddity is that the text portrays Christians, the angels, and Paul as more merciful than God.  Paul expresses pity for those suffering in Hell, but Jesus rebukes him and says that everyone in Hell truly deserves their punishment. The Archangel Michael says he prays continuously for Christians while they are alive, and weeps for the torments the failed Christians endure after it is too late.  The twenty-four elders on thrones (presumably the 12 apostles and the 12 patriarchs) as well as the four beasts described in God's throne room in the Book of Revelation also make intercession for the inhabitants of hell.  The Christian friends and family of those in Hell also make prayers for the dead that their suffering might be lessened.  In responses to the pleas of Paul (or the Virgin Mary in the Apocalypse of the Virgin), Michael, the elders, and the living Christians on Earth, Jesus agrees to release those in hell from their suffering on the day of his resurrection—presumably every Sunday.  Manuscripts include variants of the ending: A Coptic manuscript instead describes it as specifically Easter, albeit with a 50-day period afterward, possibly in addition to the Sunday off; the Greek Apocalypse of the Virgin specifically excludes damned Jews from this mercy; and an Armenian manuscript has all sinners released from hell unconditionally.

Sozomen wrote that the text was popular with monks, which makes sense given the work's sharp focus on them and how their fates differ from ordinary Christians.  Those who successfully live an ascetic lifestyle are rewarded far beyond ordinary Christians; those who live an ascetic lifestyle but are too proud are forced to wait for their reward; and those who attempt but fail at an ascetic lifestyle are punished with eternal torture.

Versions

Compared to many apocryphal works, the Apocalypse of Paul has an unusually large number of manuscripts to draw from, evincing its popularity.  Greek copies of the text are rare, however; those that exist contain many omissions. Of the Eastern versions – Syriac, Coptic, Amharic, Georgian – the Syriac are considered to be the most reliable. There is an Ethiopic version of the work which features the Virgin Mary in the place of Paul the Apostle, as the receiver of the vision, known as the "Apocalypse of the Virgin".

The lost Greek original was translated into Latin as the Visio Pauli, and was widely copied, with extensive variation coming into the tradition as the text was adapted to suit different historical and cultural contexts; by the eleventh century, there were perhaps three main independent editions of the text. From these diverse Latin texts, many subsequent vernacular versions were translated, into most European languages, prominently including German and Czech.

Reception and influence
Ancient writers are generally hostile to the Apocalypse.  Augustine called it a fraud that the true church does not accept; Sozomen wrote he investigated it personally and also found it inauthentic; and the 6th century Gelasian Decree lists it as an apocryphal writing to be rejected.  Samuel Anetsi denounces the Armenian version as the work of heretics.  Despite this, the Visio Pauli maintained its popularity (hence the large numbers of copies, especially Latin ones), and its importance was great from the 8th–15th centuries.  It was one of the most influential sources of medieval thought on the nature of the afterlife.

The Visio Pauli also influenced a range of other texts. It is particularly noted for its influence in The Divine Comedy of Dante Alighieri, who seems to have been familiar with the work.  In Inferno (ii. 28), Dante mentions the visit of the "Chosen Vessel" to Hell, presumably a reference to Paul's earlier trip. The Visio is also considered to have influenced the description of Grendel's home in the Old English poem Beowulf (whether directly or indirectly, possibly via the Old English Blickling Homily XVI).  The Legend of the Purgatory of St. Patrick seems to draw from the Apocalypse of Paul, which itself then influenced the works of Geoffrey Chaucer.

Further reading
 Jan N. Bremmer and Istvan Czachesz (edd). The Visio Pauli and the Gnostic Apocalypse of Paul (Leuven, Peeters, 2007) (Studies on Early Christian Apocrypha, 9).
 Eileen Gardiner, Visions of Heaven and Hell Before Dante (New York: Italica Press, 1989), pp. 13–46.  An English translation of the Latin text based on the M. R. James version, but removing the archaic phrasings.

Notes

References

External links

 , translation by M. R. James in the 1924 book The Apocryphal New Testament
 Bibliography on the Apocalypse of Paul.

4th-century Christian texts
Ancient Greek books
Paul
Christian apocalyptic writings
Texts in Koine Greek
Katabasis